Nestlé Nesvita Women of Strength '09 is a weekly television talk show, which selects young women, aged 14–25, to promote education, skills and choosing the right career. The show was hosted by Ayesha Khan, directed by Kamran Qureshi & Iram Qureshi and produced by Sajjad Gul's Evernew Group for Nestlé Nesvita.

Nestlé Nesvita's Women of Strength initiative aims to provide young urban women with the tools and guidance to create positive, goal-achieving changes in their lives. It tells stories of strength from women who thought they had achieved something extraordinary in life and deserved the title of ‘Woman of Strength’.

The Concept
Every woman is strong if she can believe in her and trust on her abilities. Women is the judge, jury and the lawyer. She runs the country, makes laws in the parliament, masterminds hostile takeovers in multinationals, anchors the network's primetime shows, flies a MIG jet fighter, and runs a chain of branded stores.

In between, she raises a family, runs the household and balances the marital equation. She's a woman of substance. She's a woman of strength. She does all that she can.

The Show
The show starring 26 Nestle Nesvita Women of Strength selected after going through a detailed screening process on the basis of their goals and believe in them. Each show focuses an inspiring young woman and spend a day with her in school, family and friends, to explore the factors involved to be high achiever, her goal and vision.

Live audience, her parents and mentor, a top professional from the respected field were invited in a show and run that package on set to introduce woman of strength. A female celebrity guest was there every week in the show as role model who've struggled and achieved a lot in life. In order to appreciate these women and promote their skills they were awarded Nestle Women of Strength Award for the week. In the end of the show Woman of Strength writes their goal, signs it and put that shield in a showcase area of the set.

The Themes, Goals & Guests
Every week show has a different theme.

The Target
If these ambitious girls are able to achieve even a little bit of what they are aiming for, team will consider it a success of the show and first step in the right direction. And when these girls find their way towards doing something larger than life, we can all be proud of them as icons.

Soundtrack

The theme song Khuch Khowab hen (English: There are some dreams and destinations...) was composed by Ahsan Ali Taj & Imran Rafique and sung by Maham Fatima. It was written by Sabir Zafar. Theme instrumentals and slow version of the song were used in the show.

See also
 Ariel Mothers
 Nestlé Nido Young Stars

References

External links
 
 NWOS 09 Facebook Page
 Director on set
 The Making Show

Urdu-language television shows
Television shows set in Karachi
Geo TV original programming
ARY Digital original programming